Robert E. Burt was president of the Dallas Oil Company in the early 20th century and the mayor of Dallas, Texas from 1927 to 1929.

Biography
Burt was born in Drew County, Arkansas on October 1, 1862 to James Henry Burt and Catherine Frances Turrentine. He was the son of a school teacher who moved to Dallas as a young man. He worked in a clothing store, but moved to Beaumont, Texas when oil was discovered there. He became a prominent oil man in Houston. He returned to Dallas in the early 1920s. He became president of Atlantic and Gulf Petroleum Company. 

Burt married Mary Emma “Mamie” Boone (1867–1949), daughter of Joseph Boone and Martha Sarah Prince on 5 Sept 1888 in Dallas, Texas. They had two children. Burt was a devout Baptist and was the chairman of the executive board of the Baptist General Convention of Texas. He was President of the board of Mary Hardin-Baylor College and served on several other boards including: The Baptist Standard, Baylor University and Southwestern Baptist Seminary.

Burt was elected Mayor of Dallas in 1927 on a non-partisan ticket. While in office, he instituted a city manager form of government and formulated a master plan for city improvements.

Burt refused to run for a second term as mayor and returned to Houston in 1935 where he died on August 9, 1943 at the age of 80 years.

References
 Passport #289226 issued May 18, 1923; Washington D.C.
 Obit: Dallas Morning News Aug. 10, 1943
 Census records:
 1930 Dallas, Dallas, TX; Roll T626-2315; ED. 57-37; Page 34A; Line 14
 1920 Houston, Harris, TX; Roll T625-1814; ED. 76; Page 6B; Line 61
 1910 Houston, Harris, TX; Roll T624-1559; ED. 76; Page 7B; Line 82
 1900 Dallas, Dallas, TX; Roll T623-1626; ED. 145; Page 17; Line 18
 1880 Grimes Co. TX; Roll T9-1307; Ed. 62; Page 13; Line 30
 Dallas county marriage index 1846 - 1963. (microfilm) Roll "B"
 Texas Dept. of Health. Bureau of Vital Statistics. Standard Certificate of Death. Robert Eugene Burt. No 37811
 Dallas City Directory, 1923, John F Worley Directory Co

Mayors of Dallas
1862 births
1943 deaths
People from Drew County, Arkansas